Anabazenops is a genus of birds in the family Furnariidae. 

It contains the following species:

References 

 
Bird genera
Taxonomy articles created by Polbot
Taxa named by Frédéric de Lafresnaye